Anbu is a township-level division situated in Chaozhou, Guangdong, China.

See also
List of township-level divisions of Guangdong

References

Towns in Guangdong